The women's taijiquan competition at the 1990 Asian Games in Beijing, China was held on 3 October at the Haidian Gymnasium.

Schedule

Results

References 

Women's_taijiquan